Vestsiden Askøy Idrettslag is a Norwegian association football club from Western Askøy.

The men's football team currently resides in the Fifth Division, the sixth tier of Norwegian football. It last played in the Third Division in 2010.

The team colors are black and white. Notable players include Torbjørn Kjerrgård, a former Norwegian Premier League player for SK Brann.

References

Official site 

Football clubs in Norway
Sport in Hordaland
Askøy
Association football clubs established in 1964
1964 establishments in Norway